Aaron Earl Oliker (December 5, 1903 – September 8, 1965) was an American football end. 

Oliker played college football for the West Virginia Mountaineers from 1922 to 1925. During the 1924 and 1925 seasons, the Moutaineers compiled a 16–2 record with Oliker playing "practically every minute of every game". He began his career as a backup halfback before being converted into a starter at end. He also played baseball and completed in track for the West Virginia Mountaineers.

In 1926, Oliker played one game for the Pottsville Maroons of the National Football League. 

Oliker later worked for many years with the Jefferson Standard Life Insurance Co. He died in September 1965 at age 62.

References

1903 births
1965 deaths
Players of American football from West Virginia
American football ends
West Virginia Mountaineers football players
Pottsville Maroons players
Sportspeople from Clarksburg, West Virginia